Football at the 2013 Island Games took place from 14 to 18 July 2013 at Bermuda National Stadium and the Bermuda Athletics Association in Hamilton.

Events

Medal table

Medal summary

References

 
2013 in association football
football
Football competitions in Bermuda
2013